CLEC or Clec may refer to:

Clec (album), a 1995 album by Perfect Houseplants, co-founded by Huw Warren
Colonial Land and Emigration Commission, a British government authority that existed from the 1840s to 1878
Competitive local exchange carrier, a type of telecommunications provider company
C-type lectin domain, a protein domain

See also
All pages starting "CLEC"